Histiopteris is a genus of ferns in the family Dennstaedtiaceae described as a genus in 1875.

The following species are accepted in the genus Histiopteris:
 Histiopteris alte-alpina Alderw.
 Histiopteris caudata (Copel.) Holttum
 Histiopteris conspicua Alderw.
 Histiopteris estipulata Alderw.
 Histiopteris hennipmanii Hovenkamp
 Histiopteris herbacea Copel.
 Histiopteris incisa (Thunb.) J.Sm. - Common name: batwing fern, is widespread across tropical and subtropical Asia, Australia, Africa, Latin America, and various oceanic islands.
 Histiopteris pilosa Holttum
 Histiopteris reniformis Alderw.
 Histiopteris sinuata (Brack.) J.Sm.
 Histiopteris squamulata Holttum
 Histiopteris stipulacea (Hook.) Copel.

References

Dennstaedtiaceae
Fern genera